"They Reminisce Over You (T.R.O.Y.)" is a song by Pete Rock & CL Smooth, inspired by the death of their close friend Troy Dixon (better known as "Trouble" T. Roy of Heavy D & the Boyz) in 1990. The song was the lead single off their debut album, Mecca and the Soul Brother, released in 1992, and later became a staple of early 1990s hip hop. The song peaked at #58 on the Billboard Hot 100 and #1 on the Hot Rap Tracks chart. The song contains a sample from "Today" by Tom Scott and the California Dreamers.

Overview
Pete Rock in a 2007 interview with The Village Voice:

Content
Over a saxophone and bass sample of Tom Scott's cover of "Today" by Jefferson Airplane, CL Smooth unravels fond memories of his own childhood, being the son of a young teenage mother, her father and four siblings, and the love he feels for other family members in working class Mount Vernon. The chorus's ad libs are provided by Pete Rock. The 12 second intro is sampled from the 1971 song "When She Made Me Promise" by The Beginning of the End. The B-side of the 12" pressing is "The Creator", which is taken from the group's 1991 EP, All Souled Out.

Acclaim
Although not a chart topper at the time of its release, "Reminisce..." has since gone on to become a staple in hip hop; one that immediately recalls a certain period in time (the early 1990s) as well as paying respect to lost ones, and acknowledging family members. Many critics consider it one of the best produced hip hop songs, and it continues to appear on many "Greatest Songs" lists such as Q Magazine's "1001 Best Songs Ever", Spin Magazine's "Top 20 Singles of the 90s", and The Source's "100 Best Rap Singles Of All Time". It was voted #6 in About.com's Top 100 Rap Songs. It was also number 90 on VH1's 100 Greatest Songs of Hip Hop. Pitchfork included the song at #35 on their Top 200 Tracks of the 90s.

Rolling Stone magazine ranked the song #12 on its list of "The 50 Greatest Hip-Hop Songs of All Time." It was ranked #430 on "Top 500 Greatest Songs of All Time" in 2021.

Summary
"They Reminisce Over You" features a jazz bass line with a constant saxophone riff, and a backup singers' harmony in the background. Verse one focuses on the hardships of growing up with a single mother. CL Smooth raps about how his father did not play a role in helping his mother raise him or his sister, and how his mother was forced to take on both roles in the household. He says that although his mother raised him right, he still needed a male figure in his life. He ultimately concludes the first verse saying that the lack of male leadership destines young men to repeat the cycle of not being involved in their own children’s lives. In the second verse, CL Smooth talks about how his uncle played the crucial role of a male father figure in his life and helped him become a man and how more males need to make a positive impact on the community. Finally in the third verse, CL Smooth speaks to his friend Troy. He thanks him for being one of the only people who believed in him and kept him on the right path. He then continues to update Troy on the well being of his family and saying that they reminisce about him.

References and cover versions
The song has been lyrically referenced by numerous artists, including "My Advice 2 You" by Gang Starr off the Moment of Truth album, "Home of the Greats" by Black Milk, "Can't Tell Me Nothing" by Kanye West, "Reminisce" by Mos Def, Bilal, and Common, "Ego Trippin' (Part Two)" by De La Soul, "Memory Lane" by Nas, "Stay Around" by Talib Kweli, "It Is Me" by Method Man, "Nostalgia" by Chance the Rapper, "I Want You" by Common, "School of Hard Knocks" by Californian Rock/Rap group P.O.D., and "More" by Flying Lotus featuring Anderson .Paak. The title of Shaquille O'Neal's song "Biological Didn't Bother" is taken from the song's lyrics.

The duo of Rock and Smooth themselves lent their voices to a 2003 version of the song titled "Reminisce '03", by Mr. Cheeks. A sample of the song was used in the remix to Mary J. Blige's single "Reminisce". The instrumental version is the main song from the video game NBA Street Vol. 2. The song was also featured in the video game Madden NFL 12 as part of that game's EA Trax. In 2012, Lupe Fiasco's song "Around My Way (Freedom Ain't Free)" from Food & Liquor II: The Great American Rap Album Pt. 1 recreated with studio musicians and did not actually use any of the original Tom Scott sax or James Brown drums, it stirred up a controversy by infuriating Pete Rock, who said he felt "violated." Fiasco further references the song in the title of the final track of Tetsuo & Youth, "They.Resurrect.Over.New (T.R.O.N.)."

Track listing
 Side A
"They Reminisce Over You (T.R.O.Y.)"
"They Reminisce Over You (T.R.O.Y.)" (instrumental)
"The Creator (Slide to the Side Remix)"
 Side B
"The Creator (Slide to the Side Remix)" (instrumental)
"Creator" (EP mix)
"Creator" (EP mix) (instrumental)

References

External links

Pete Rock songs
1992 singles
1992 songs
Elektra Records singles
Songs written by Pete Rock
Songs written by CL Smooth
Jazz rap songs
Commemoration songs